The 2016 Los Cabos Open (or Abierto Mexicano Los Cabos) was an ATP tennis tournament played on outdoor hard courts. It was the 1st edition of the Los Cabos Open, and part of the ATP World Tour 250 series of the 2016 ATP World Tour. It took place in Los Cabos, Mexico from August 8 through August 13, 2016. It took over from the Claro Open in Bogotá, Colombia that had been held the previous 3 years.

Singles main-draw entrants

Seeds 

 Rankings are as of August 1, 2016.

Other entrants 
The following players received wildcards into the singles main draw:
  Pablo Carreño Busta 
  Lucas Gómez 
  Tigre Hank

The following player received entry as a special exempt:
  Reilly Opelka

The following players received entry from the qualifying draw:
  Jared Donaldson 
  Noah Rubin
  Amir Weintraub
  Mischa Zverev

Withdrawals
Before the tournament
  Kyle Edmund → replaced by  Dušan Lajović 
  Taylor Fritz → replaced by  Horacio Zeballos
  Benoît Paire → replaced by  Sergiy Stakhovsky
  Lucas Pouille → replaced by  Tim Smyczek
  Albert Ramos Viñolas → replaced by  Thiago Monteiro
  Diego Schwartzman → replaced by  Santiago Giraldo
  Dominic Thiem → replaced by  Austin Krajicek

Retirements
  Dušan Lajović
  Sergiy Stakhovsky

Doubles main-draw entrants

Seeds 

 Rankings are as of August 1, 2016.

Other entrants 
The following pairs received wildcards into the doubles main draw:
  Daniel Garza /  Tigre Hank 
  Hans Hach /  Luis Patiño

Withdrawals 
Before the tournament
  Marcel Granollers /  Feliciano López
  Sergiy Stakhovsky (back injury)

Retirements 
  Horacio Zeballos (back injury)

Champions

Singles 

  Ivo Karlović def.  Feliciano López, 7–6(7–5), 6–2

Doubles 

  Purav Raja /  Divij Sharan def.  Jonathan Erlich /  Ken Skupski, 7–6(7–4), 7–6(7–3)

References

External links 
 

Los Cabos Open
2016 in Mexican tennis
2016